The 1937 Chicago White Sox season was the White Sox's 37th season in the major leagues, and their 38th season overall . They finished with a record of 86–68, good enough for 3rd place in the American League, 16 games behind the first place New York Yankees.

Regular season

Season standings

Record vs. opponents

Opening Day lineup 
 Rip Radcliff, LF
 Larry Rosenthal, CF
 Dixie Walker, RF
 Zeke Bonura, 1B
 Luke Appling, SS
 Jackie Hayes, 2B
 Boze Berger, 3B
 Luke Sewell, C
 Vern Kennedy, P

Roster

Player stats

Batting 
Note: G = Games played; AB = At Bats; R = Runs scored; H = Hits; 2B = Doubles; 3B = Triples; HR = Home runs; RBI = Runs batted in; BB = Base on balls; SO = Strikeouts; AVG = Batting average; SB = Stolen bases

Pitching 
Note: W = Wins; L = Losses; ERA = Earned run average; G = Games pitched; GS = Games started; SV = Saves; IP = Innings pitched; H = Hits allowed; R = Runs allowed; ER = Earned runs allowed; HR = Home runs allowed; BB = Walks allowed; K = Strikeouts

Farm system

Notes

References 
 1937 Chicago White Sox at Baseball Reference

Chicago White Sox seasons
Chicago White Sox season
Chicago White